Richard Montanari is an American crime writer who debuted with his novel Deviant Way, published by Simon & Schuster, in 1995. It won the Online Mystery Award (OLMA) for Best First Mystery. He has since published seven more novels, which are now available in almost 30 languages.

In 2005 he began his Philadelphia crime series with The Rosary Girls, a police procedural thriller set inside the homicide unit of the Philadelphia Police Department, introducing detectives Kevin Byrne and Jessica Balzano.

Montanari was born in Northeast Ohio, where he still resides.

Publishing history

Cleveland Series
 Deviant Ways (1995)
 Kiss of Evil (2001)

In 1995 Montanari wrote Deviant Way, introducing Cleveland Police Department homicide detective John Paris. The story, a suspense novel chronicling a pair of thrill killers, earned him a two-book deal from Michael Korda at Simon & Schuster. In 2001 Montanari published the sequel, Kiss of Evil. Both novels have been published worldwide, and were recently reissued by Random House UK.

Philadelphia Series
 The Rosary Girls (2005)
 The Skin Gods (2006)
 Merciless (2007) (UK title Broken Angels) (2007)
 Badlands (UK title Play Dead) (2008)
 The Echo Man (2011)
 The Killing Room (2012)
 The Stolen Ones (2013)
 The Doll Maker (2014)
 Shutter Man (2015)

Set inside the homicide unit of the Philadelphia Police Department, these novels include the alternating narratives of veteran police detective Kevin Francis Byrne, and his younger partner Jessica Balzano.

The stories, which "possess a psychological depth all too rare in such fiction" (Publishers Weekly), also include other recurring characters, most notably Detective Joshua Bontrager, who was, at one time, a member of the Amish church. This series is published in France by Le Cherche Midi, in Italy by Editrice Nord, in Germany by Verlagsgruppe Lübbe, and in Denmark by People's Press.

Other works
In addition to his crime series, Montanari has penned two stand-alone novels. In 1998 he published The Violet Hour, a thriller featuring freelance writer Nicky Stella. In 2009 he published The Devil’s Garden, a psychological thriller introducing New York District Attorney Michael Roman.

As a journalist Montanari has written essays, profiles, articles, and both film and literary criticism in more than 200 publications, including The Chicago Tribune, Detroit Free Press, The Seattle Times, The Plain Dealer, and many others.

According to a 1997 interview published in Volume XI, Issue 4 of Ohio Writer, Montanari's first screenplay "The Skin Gods" made it as far as the 1996 quarter-finals of the Nicholl Fellowship in Screenwriting Awards. The novel of the same name was published in 2003.

References
"Interview, Richard Montanari" Book Reporter 2006
"Interview, Richard Montanari" Chris High, Crime Time Magazine 2007
"Interview, Richard Montanari" Shots Magazine 2009

External links
 Richard Montanari website
 Richard Montanari at Random House US
 Richard Montanari at Random House UK
 The Rosary Girls mini-site

20th-century American novelists
21st-century American novelists
American crime fiction writers
American male novelists
Novelists from Ohio
Living people
1952 births
20th-century American male writers
21st-century American male writers